Soledad Rendón Bueno (July 9, 1943 – August 18, 1970), better known by her stage names Soledad Miranda or Susann Korda (or sometimes Susan Korday), was an actress and pop singer who was born in Seville, Spain. She starred in several erotic thriller films directed by Jess Franco in 1969 and 1970, such as Count Dracula (1970) and Vampyros Lesbos (1970). 

She also released numerous Spanish-language pop songs throughout the mid-sixties. She died in a car accident on a Lisbon highway in August 1970: she was 27. She was just about to sign a film contract with Franco's producer, Karl Heinz Mannchen.

Biography

Early life 
Soledad Miranda was born Soledad Rendón Bueno on July 9,1943 in Seville, Spain. Soledad (whose name translates as solitude or loneliness) was the niece of the famous Spanish singer-actress-flamenco dancer, Paquita Rico. At age 8, Miranda made her professional debut when she was hired as a flamenco dancer and singe- first in the "Youth Galas" at the Seville Fair and San Fernando theatre, and then on a tour throughout southern Spain.

Career 
At age 16, Miranda moved to Madrid and drew an artistic stage name out of a hat. She made her film debut in 1960 as a dancer in a musical called La Bella Mimí. She was often in the tabloids as the rumored girlfriend of the most famous bullfighter of the time: Manuel Benítez (El Cordobés).

Miranda went on to appear in over 30 films from 1960 to 1970. There were epic adventures (Ursus, Cervantes); horror films (Sound of Horror, Pyro); dramas (Canción de cuna, Currito de la Cruz); comedies (Eva 63, La familia y uno más); and even a Spaghetti Western (Sugar Colt). She also released a couple of yé-yé pop records in the mid-1960s.

After taking two years off to raise her son (see "Personal life"), she returned to acting with a role in the western 100 Rifles (1969). She went on appear in additional films and in Spanish television shows. Director Jess Franco, for whom Miranda had done a small role in his musical Queen of the Tabarin Club, made Miranda his frequent star in films including Count Dracula, Eugenie de Sade, Vampyros Lesbos, She Killed in Ecstasy, Nightmares Come at Night, and The Devil Came from Akasava. Since Franco's films involved explicit nudity, Miranda took the stage name Susann Korda (alternately spelled Susan Korday or Susan Korda) during this period.

Personal life
In 1964, Miranda had made a trio of films in Portugal. José Manuel da Conceiçao Simões, a Portuguese racecar driver, was a producer and also acted in them. In one of the films, Un día en Lisboa (A Day in Lisbon), they played a couple traveling between Estoril and Lisbon. After a secret courtship, the pair married in 1966. In April 1967, Miranda gave birth to a son, Antonio. Her husband retired from racing and took a job in the auto industry.

On the morning of August 18,1970, after completing the filming of The Devil Came from Akasava, Miranda and her husband were involved in a collision with a small truck near Lisbon. Simões suffered minor injuries, but Miranda died as a result of major head and back trauma. She and Jess Franco had started filming her next project (Justine) which he abandoned after her death. He had also planned to feature her in his 1970 film, which he made later with a different actress.

Filmography
 1960 Queen of the Tabarin Club as Duchess (uncredited)
 1961 Ursus aka Ursus, Son of Hercules as Fillide
 1961 La bella Mimí as First Dancer
 1961 Canción de cuna as Teresa
 1963 The Castilian as Maria Estevez
 1963 Eva 63 as Soledad
 1963 Cuatro bodas y pico as Mari-Luci
 1963 Bochorno as Piluca
 1963 The Daughters of Helena as Mari Pó
 1964 Pyro... The Thing Without a Face as Liz Frade
 1964 Los gatos negros / A canção da Saudade as Babá
 1964 Un día en Lisboa as Herself (documentary short)
 1964 Fin de semana (Weekend) as Sonsoles
 1964 Sound of Horror as Maria 
 1965 Playa de Formentor as Sandra
 1965 Currito of the Cross as Rocío Carmona
 1965 La familia y uno más as Patricia
 1966 He's My Man! as Leonor Jiménez
 1966 The Mimí del Franval as Susan
 1966 Sugar Colt as Josefa
 1967 Cervantes as Nessa
 1968 Comanche blanco as India (uncredited)
 1969 100 Rifles as Girl In Hotel
 1969 Estudio amueblado 2-P as Maribel
 1969 Soltera y madre en la vida as Paloma
 1969 Lola la piconera as Rosarillo
 1969 Nightmares Come at Night as Neighbor's Girlfriend
 1969 Sex Charade as Anne (a lost film, never released)
 1970 Count Dracula as Lucy Westenra
 1970 Cuadecuc/Vampir (documentary) as Herself
 1970 Eugenie de Sade as Eugénie Radeck de Franval 
 1970 Vampyros Lesbos aka "Las Vampiras" as Countess Nadine Carody (as Susann Korda)
 1970 She Killed in Ecstasy (a.k.a. Mrs. Hyde) as Mrs. Johnson
 1970 The Devil Came from Akasava as Jane Morgan
 1970 Juliette (uncompleted, a lost film)

Discography 
 Soledad Miranda – Belter 51.451 (1964)
 Soledad Miranda – Belter 51.598 (1965)

References

Literature 
 Brown, Amy: Soledad Miranda: A Treasure Lost, in: Sirens of Cinema Magazine, Winter 2003
 Lucas, Tim: The Black Stare of Soledad Miranda, in European Trash Cinema, 1991
 Overzier, Gregor: Soledad Miranda/Susann Korda, in: Norbert Stresau, Heinrich Wimmer (Hrg.): Enzyklopädie des phantastischen Films, 70. Ergänzungslieferung, Corian, Meitingen 2004

External links 
 
 
 
 Sublime Soledad
 Soledad Miranda: Soledad y Santitad by Amy Brown – BCult

1943 births
1970 deaths
Spanish actresses
Road incident deaths in Portugal
Spanish film actresses
Spanish women pop singers
Spanish people of Portuguese descent
20th-century Spanish actresses
20th-century Spanish singers
20th-century Spanish women singers